OGLE-2003-BLG-235Lb/MOA-2003-BLG-53Lb is an extrasolar planet discovered in April 2004 by the OGLE and MOA collaborations. Its high mass indicates that it is most probably a gas giant planet similar to Jupiter. It is located around 4.3 AU away from its parent star.

References

External links 

 
Hubble site document 2006/38
HST image of planetary host star
SPACE.com: Hidden Star of Known Planet Found (Ker Than) 8 August 2006 01:01 pm ET

Exoplanets discovered in 2004
Giant planets
Sagittarius (constellation)
Exoplanets detected by microlensing